Wintersweet is a common name for several plants and may refer to:

Acokanthera oblongifolia, a plant of southern Africa
Acokanthera oppositifolia, a shrub of central and southern Africa
Chimonanthus praecox, a shrub of China
Origanum dictamnus, a plant of Crete
Origanum vulgare subsp. vulgare, a subspecies of Oregano

References